Dane Robert DiLiegro (born August 6, 1988) is an American actor and former basketball player. DiLiegro played professional basketball for eight seasons for teams in Italy and Israel. DiLiegro currently resides in Los Angeles, and in 2022 starred as the Predator in the film Prey.

Career

Basketball

After graduating from Lexington High School in 2006, DiLiegro went on to spend a year at Worcester Academy, where he refined his skills as a basketball player in the school's postgraduate program. He averaged 11 points, 10 rebounds, and 4 blocks at Worcester. This led to DiLiegro receiving a full athletic scholarship to play at the University of New Hampshire.

As a four-year starter for the New Hampshire Wildcats from 2007 to 2011, DiLiegro found his place on the team through defense, rebounding, and outworking his opponents.  He graduated from UNH in May 2011 with the second-highest number of rebounds in program history. DiLiegro made ESPN's Top Ten plays of the day on February 19, 2009, for a dunk.

After going undrafted in the 2011 NBA Draft, DiLiegro went on to play in Europe, being a part of Assi Basket Ostuni, (Ostuni, Italy), Dinamo Sassari (Sassari, Sardinia, Italy), Pallacanestro Trieste (Trieste, Italy), Hapoel Gilboa Galil, (Gan Ner, Israel), Mens Sana 1871 Basket (Siena, Italy), Tezenis Verona (Verona, Italy), and Pallacanestro Forlì (Forlì, Italy).

DiLiegro won a gold medal with Team USA as a basketball player at the 18th Maccabiah Games in 2009 in Israel.

Acting

In 2019, DiLiegro was invited to work as a stand-in on Free Guy, which was filming in his native Boston. While on the set, stunt coordinator  Chris O’Hara suggested to DiLiegro to look into acting.  Just two weeks later, DiLiegro was cast to play Muscle Monster in the Netflix show Sweet Home. The role required him to wear a foam latex suit weighing 80 pounds. He followed it by playing Master Chief in an Xbox commercial. In 2021, he portrayed the titular character Ba'al in the fifth episode of American Horror Stories. DiLiegro will appear in the upcoming Tom DeLonge-directed Monsters of California

He stars in the Predator film Prey as the Predator; He performed all the acting, stunts and motion capture of the creature. Prior to filming, he lost 25 pounds and spent months training parkour, martial arts and strengthening his neck due to the new design of the Predator, which sat the 15 pound animatronic head on top of his head, forcing him to shoot every scene essentially blind.

DiLiegro conducted a substantial amount of research in preparation for his role as the Predator: 

Director Dan Trachtenberg on DiLiegro's performance: 

DiLiegro has confirmed that he will be appearing in smaller roles on unspecified upcoming Marvel and Lucasfilm productions.

In 2022, Comic Book Resources named DiLiegro among the top ten monster actors of all time.

Personal life
DiLiegro's father played basketball and wrestled at the University of New Hampshire, and his brother played basketball for the Syracuse Orange from 2003 to 2007. He holds USA, Italian, and Israeli citizenship. His father is of Italian descent, with roots in Gaeta and Canosa di Puglia, and his mother is Jewish.

DiLiegro served as an apprentice under famed Tuscan butcher Dario Cecchini for multiple years, they maintain a close friendship to this day.

DiLiegro hosts a culinary travel series on YouTube called Adventure Monday, which he tried to pitch in Los Angeles as a possible television series.

Filmography

Film

Television

Music video

Commercial

References

External links
 Dane DiLiegro at sportingpulse.com, LNP
 Dane DiLiegro at eurocupbasketball.com, Eurocup
 Dane DiLiegro at euroleague.net Euroleague
 Bio at unhwildcats.com
 

1988 births
Living people
21st-century American male actors
Basketball players from Massachusetts
Dinamo Sassari players
Male actors from Massachusetts
New Hampshire Wildcats men's basketball players
Pallacanestro Trieste players
People from Lexington, Massachusetts